is a Japanese racing driver, known for his successes in single-seater junior categories, including winning the 2013 Formula Challenge Japan and the 2012 Motegi Championship Formula Super FJ. He currently races in the Super Formula Championship, Super GT.

Career

Karting
Yamashita competed in karts before graduating to single-seater cars in 2012.

Formula Super FJ and Formula Challenge Japan
Yamashita began his racing car career in the 2012 Motegi Championship Formula Super FJ, which he won in his first season. In all four starts, he took the pole, fastest lap, and race win. In 2013, he progressed to the Formula Challenge Japan series, which was a racing category intended for drivers between entry level and Formula 3. He scored 7 podiums and in 12 races, including 4 wins, and took the championship title.

All-Japan Formula Three
In 2014, Yamashita graduated to the All-Japan Formula Three Championship with the Petronas Team TOM'S. He finished runner-up in the championship to the more experienced Nobuharu Matsushita.

In 2015, Yamashita continued to race in the All-Japan Formula Three Championship, and currently holds the lead of the championship. In addition, he has raced in the GT300 category of the 2015 Super GT season.

Super GT

Super Formula

FIA World Endurance Championship

Racing record

Career summary

‡ Team standings.

Complete Super GT results
(key) (Races in bold indicate pole position) (Races in italics indicate fastest lap)

† Driver did not finish the race, but was classified as he completed over 90% of the race distance.
‡ Half points awarded as less than 75% of race distance was completed.

Complete Super Formula results
(key) (Races in bold indicate pole position) (Races in italics indicate fastest lap)

‡ Half points awarded as less than 75% of race distance was completed.

Complete FIA World Endurance Championship results

Complete 24 Hours of Le Mans results

References

External links
 
 

1995 births
Living people
People from Chiba (city)
Sportspeople from Chiba Prefecture
Japanese racing drivers
Formula Challenge Japan drivers
Japanese Formula 3 Championship drivers
Super Formula drivers
Super GT drivers
FIA World Endurance Championship drivers
TOM'S drivers
T-Sport drivers
Kondō Racing drivers
Team LeMans drivers
Toyota Gazoo Racing drivers